Hugh Stevenson may refer to:
 Hugh Stevenson (footballer), Scottish footballer
 Hugh Stevenson (rower), American rower
 Hugh Stevenson (investment banker), British businessman
 Hugh Allan Stevenson, physician and politician in Ontario, Canada